The Menat Formation is a geologic formation in France. It preserves fossils dating back to the Paleocene. It is a maar deposit located on top of an ancient volcano, the extent is very localised with the outcropping area being around 600 by 1000 metres. Numerous species of fossil insects, plants and fish are known, as well as some isolated mammals, including the primate Plesiadapis insignis,  the choristodere reptile Lazarussuchus, and birds, including members of Halcyornithidae and Messelasturidae and relatives of Songziidae.

See also

 List of fossiliferous stratigraphic units in France

References

 

Paleogene France